The 1964 Texas A&M Aggies football team represented Texas A&M University in the 1964 NCAA University Division football season as a member of the Southwest Conference (SWC). The Aggies were led by head coach Hank Foldberg in his third season and finished with a record of one win and nine losses (1–9 overall, 1–6 in the SWC).

Schedule

References

Texas AandM
Texas A&M Aggies football seasons
Texas AandM Aggies football